Wardman is a surname. Notable people with the surname include:
 Chris Wardman, Canadian music producer, musician and songwriter
 Harry Wardman (1872–1938), American real estate developer
 Sophia Wardman, musician